Yurevich is a Belarusian surname.  Its Lithuanized form is Jurevičius, Polonized: Jurewicz.

It may refer to:

 Alyaksandr Yurevich (born 1979), Belarusian footballer
 Anatoliy Yurevich (born 1957), Belarusian football coach
 Julia Yurevich, beauty pageant contestant who represented Bulgaria in Miss World 2008
 Mikhail Yurevich (born 1969), former governor (2010–2014) of Chelyabinsk Oblast, Russia

Belarusian-language surnames
Russian-language surnames